Karwat is a 1982 Bollywood action film directed by Anil Ganguly, starring Mithun Chakraborty, Rakesh Roshan, Bindiya Goswami and Zarina Wahab. 
The release of the film took place in 1987 under the name Mera Yaar Mera Dushman.

Plot

Karwat is the story of 2 friends turning foes, but finally they join against their common enemy.

Cast

Mithun Chakraborty
Rakesh Roshan
Bindiya Goswami
Zarina Wahab
Sujit Kumar
Deven Verma
Geeta Nizami

Soundtrack

References

External links
 

1982 films
1980s Hindi-language films
Indian action films
1982 action films